Figurative art, sometimes written as figurativism, describes artwork (particularly paintings and sculptures) that is clearly derived from real object sources and so is, by definition, representational. The term is often in contrast to abstract art:

Since the arrival of abstract art the term figurative has been used to refer to any form of modern art that retains strong references to the real world.

Painting and sculpture can therefore be divided into the categories of figurative, representational and abstract, although, strictly speaking, abstract art is derived (or abstracted) from a figurative or other natural source. However, "abstract" is sometimes used as a synonym for non-representational art and non-objective art, i.e. art which has no derivation from figures or objects.

Figurative art is not synonymous with figure painting (art that represents the human figure), although human and animal figures are frequent subjects.

Formal elements
The formal elements, those aesthetic effects created by design, upon which figurative art is dependent, include line, shape, color, light and dark, mass, volume, texture, and perspective, although these elements of design could also play a role in creating other types of imagery—for instance abstract, or non-representational or non-objective two-dimensional artwork.  The difference is that in figurative art these elements are deployed to create an impression or illusion of form and space, and, usually, to create emphasis in the narrative portrayed.

Evolution

Figurative art is itself based upon a tacit understanding of abstracted shapes: the figure sculpture of Greek antiquity was not naturalistic, for its forms were idealized and geometric. Ernst Gombrich referred to the strictures of this schematic imagery, the adherence to that which was already known, rather than that which is seen, as the "Egyptian method", an allusion to the memory-based clarity of imagery in Egyptian art.
Eventually idealization gave way to observation, and a figurative art which balanced ideal geometry with greater realism was seen in Classical sculpture by 480 B.C. The Greeks referred to the reliance on visual observation as mimesis. Until the time of the Impressionists, figurative art was characterized by attempts to reconcile these opposing principles.

From the early Renaissance, Mannerism and the Baroque through 18th-, 19th- and 20th-century painting Figurative art has steadily broadened its parameters.  An important landmark in the evolution of figurative art is the first known reclining nude in Western painting in Sleeping Venus (1510) by Giorgione.  It introduced the female nude as subject and started a long line of famous paintings.

Nicolas Poussin (1594–1665), a French painter in the classical style whose work predominantly features clarity, logic, and order, and favors line over color, served as an alternative to the more narrative Baroque style of the 17th century. He was a major inspiration for such classically oriented artists as Jacques-Louis David, Jean-Auguste-Dominique Ingres and Paul Cézanne. The rise of the Neoclassical art of Jacques-Louis David ultimately engendered the realistic reactions of Gustave Courbet and Édouard Manet leading to the multi-faceted figurative art of the 20th century.

In November, 2018, scientists reported the discovery of the oldest known figurative art painting, over 40,000 (perhaps as old as 52,000) years old, of an unknown animal, in the cave of Lubang Jeriji Saléh on the Indonesian island of Borneo.

Architecture, townscape

History painting

Human forms

Landscape, seascape

Still life

Cave painting

See also
 Abstract art
 Illustration
 Narrative art
 Neofigurative Art
 Realism (arts)
 Stuckism

Notes and references

External links

Figurative art at TATE.org